Albania participated in the Eurovision Song Contest 2014 in Copenhagen, Denmark, with the song "One Night's Anger" performed by Hersi. Its selected entry was chosen through the national selection competition Festivali i Këngës organised by Radio Televizioni Shqiptar (RTSH) in December 2013.

Background 

The first entry was performed by Anjeza Shahini with the song "The Image of You" and finished in the seventh place, the nation's second-highest placing to date. During its tenure in the contest, Albania failed to qualify for the final four times, with the  entry being the most recent non-qualifier.

Before Eurovision

Festivali i Këngës 

Festivali i Këngës 52 was the 52nd annual edition of the Albanian music competition Festivali i Këngës and the eleventh time the competition was used to determine the artist and song that would represent Albania at the Eurovision Song Contest, this time selecting their 2014 contest entry. The competition consisted of two semi-finals on 26 and 27 December 2013 and a final on 28 December 2013, held at the Palace of Congresses in Tirana. Enkel Demi hosted all three shows with Xhesika Berberi and Marinela Meta co-hosting the two semi-finals and Klea Huta co-hosting the final.

The two semi-finals each featured eight artists performing their competing entries a duet of a past competing entry from Festivali i Këngës with another Albanian artist. In the final, the sixteen competing entries were voted upon by a jury panel in order to select the winner. The seven-person jury panel consisted of:

Agim Krajkacomposer
Aleksandër Lalocomposer
Haig Zachariancomposer
Xhevahir Spahiuwriter
Petrit Malajactor
Eriona Rushitimusicologist
Bojken Lakosinger

Competing entries 

RTSH invited interested artists and composers to submit their entries on 8, 9 and 22 October 2013. The broadcaster received approximately 40 submissions. On 4 November 2013, RTSH announced the sixteen artists and songs selected for the competition by a special committee. One entry was later withdrawn: "Jeta në orën 4" performed by Orges Toçe. "Jehona" performed by NA was named as the replacement entry.

Key:
 Withdrawn
 Replacement entry

Shows

Semi-finals 

The first semi-final took place on 26 December 2013. The interval acts for the first semi-final included 2013 Albanian Eurovision Song Contest entrants Adrian Lulgjuraj and Bledar Sejko. The second semi-final took place on 27 December 2013. The interval act for the second semi-final included the RTSH orchestra performing the Festivali I Këngës 1 winning song "Fëmija i parë".

Final 

The final took place on 28 December 2013. Sixteen entries competed. At the conclusion of the show, as voted upon by a seven-member jury panel who each awarded points from 1 to 8, 10 and 12 to their top ten songs, "Zemërimi i një nate" performed by Hersiana Matmuja was selected as the winner. The interval acts for the final included Eurovision Song Contest 2013 winner Emmelie de Forest and The Voice of Italy winner Elhaida Dani.

At Eurovision 

The Eurovision Song Contest 2014 took place at B&W Hallerne in Copenhagen, Denmark, and consisted of two semi-finals held on 6 and 8 May, respectively, and the grand final on 10 May 2014.

On 20 January 2014, a special allocation draw was held at the Copenhagen City Hall in Copenhagen that placed each country into one of the two semi-finals, as well as which half of the show they would perform in. Albania was placed into the first semi-final, to be held on 6 May, and was scheduled to perform in the first half of the show. Once all the competing songs for the contest had been released, the running order for the semi-finals was decided by the producers of the contest rather than through another draw, for preventing similar songs being placed next to each other; Albania was set to perform in position 6, following  and preceding . At the end of the first semi-final, the country was not announced among the top 10 entries and therefore failed to qualify for the final, marking Albania's fifth non-qualification in the Eurovision Song Contest.

Voting 

The tables below visualise a breakdown of points awarded to Albania in the first semi-final of the Eurovision Song Contest 2014, as well as by the country for both the first semi-final and grand final. The points awarded by Albania in both the first semi-final and the final were based on 100% jury voting due to either technical issues with the televoting or an insufficient number of valid votes cast during the televote period.

Points awarded to Albania

Points awarded by Albania

Detailed voting results
The following members comprised the Albanian jury:
  (jury chairperson)composer/producer 
 Alfred Kacinaricomposer/producer
 Jetmir Barbullushicomposer, conductor, musician
 Mira Tucijournalist for art and culture
 journalist, producer, director

References

External links  

 

2014
Countries in the Eurovision Song Contest 2014
2013
Eurovision
Eurovision